The Root of All Evil? is a British television series which aired from 1968 to 1969. According to IMDb, it was an anthology series with a monetary theme. It was produced by Yorkshire Television and aired on ITV. Unlike many ITV series of the 1960s, the programme survives intact.

Episode list
Series 1:
The Bonus (aired 1 October 1968)
The Fireplace Firm (aired 8 October 1968)
You Can Only Buy Once (aired 15 October 1968)
The Last of the Big Spenders (aired 22 October 1968)
Money for Change (aired 29 October 1968)
Of Course We Trust You Arnold (aired 5 November 1968)
West of Eden (aired 12 November 1968)
The Right Attitude? (aired 19 November 1968)

Series 2:
The Long Sixpence (aired 24 November 1969)
A Bit of a Holiday (aired 1 December 1969)
What's in It for Me? (aired 8 December 1969)
Bloxham's Concerto for Critic and Carpenter (aired 15 December 1969)
Floating Man (aired 22 December 1969)

References

External links
The Root of All Evil? on IMDb

1968 British television series debuts
1969 British television series endings
1960s British drama television series
1960s British anthology television series
English-language television shows
Black-and-white British television shows
ITV television dramas
Television series by ITV Studios
Television series by Yorkshire Television